Joseph Jean Pierre Hamel (born June 6, 1952) is a Canadian former professional ice hockey player who played 699 games over 12 seasons in the National Hockey League. He played for the St. Louis Blues, Detroit Red Wings, Quebec Nordiques, and Montreal Canadiens. Jean is the brother of Gilles Hamel.

Hamel was born in Asbestos, Quebec. As a youth, he played in the 1965 Quebec International Pee-Wee Hockey Tournament with a minor ice hockey team from Asbestos.

Hamel retired from professional hockey in 1984, as a direct result of having sustained two serious eye injuries while playing for the Montreal Canadiens that year — the first, caused by Louis Sleigher's sucker punch during the April 20 "Good Friday Massacre", and the second, during an October 4 pre-season match.

When Hamel retired, the Canadiens organization hired him as an assistant coach with their new Sherbrooke Canadiens farm team in the American Hockey League (AHL).  Hamel served as an assistant coach, later head coach, during the entire six seasons that the Sherbrooke Canadiens existed as a franchise.  During his final two years as head coach, the Sherbrooke Canadiens finished first overall in the AHL for the 1988–89 and 1989–90 AHL regular seasons.  Starting the next season, Hamel served as head coach of the Drummondville Voltigeurs, in the Quebec Major Junior Hockey League, for four seasons.  After a four-year break, Hamel returned to his birthplace as head coach with the Asbestos Aztecs,  of the Quebec Semi-Pro Hockey League, for one season (1999–2000).

Career statistics

References

External links 

1952 births
Adirondack Red Wings players
Canadian ice hockey defencemen
Denver Spurs players
Detroit Red Wings players
Drummondville Rangers players
Drummondville Voltigeurs coaches
Fredericton Express players
Ice hockey people from Quebec
Kansas City Red Wings players
Living people
Montreal Canadiens players
People from Val-des-Sources
Quebec Nordiques players
St. Louis Blues draft picks
St. Louis Blues players
Canadian ice hockey coaches